Ta Erotika (Greek: Τα ερωτικά) is the name of a compilation album by singer prominent Greek singer Marinella under the Universal Music Greece series Ta Erotika. The album is part of the compilation. This album contains Marinella's #1 love songs from 1974 - 1987 in remastered sound. It was first released as a double compilation album, titled Marinella - Gia Panta (Marinella - Forever), in 1988 by PolyGram Greece/Philips in Greece, and was re-released in October, 1994, titled Ta Erotika: Marinella. A new edition of this compilation was re-issued on a 2-CD set in 2000, and in February, 2007 by Universal Music.

Track listing

Disc 1
 "Antio" feat. The Athenians & Tzavara Twins - 3:17 - (Kostas Hatzis - Sotia Tsotou)
 This song had been released on Marinella & Athenians.
 "Tha 'thela na isoun (Agapi mou)" feat. The Athenians & Tzavara Twins - 3:34 - (Giorgos Hadjinasios - Nikos Vrettos)
 This song had been released on Marinella & Athenians.
 "Ki' ystera" - 2:00 - (Kostas Hatzis - Sotia Tsotou)
 This song had been released on Marinella Gia Panta.
 "Ego ki' esy" in duet with Tolis Voskopoulos - 3:24 - (Tolis Voskopoulos - Mimis Theiopoulos)
 This song had been released on Marinella & Tolis Voskopoulos - Ego Ki' Esy.
 "Giati fovase (From souvenirs to souvenirs)" - 3:17 - (Stélios Vlavianós - Robert Constandinos - Pythagoras)
 This song had been released on Marinella Gia Panta.
 "Tora tipota" feat. The Athenians & Tzavara Twins - 4:27 - (Tolis Voskopoulos - Mimis Theiopoulos)
 This song had been released on Marinella & Athenians.
 "O telefteos mou stathmos" - 3:13 - (Giorgos Katsaros - Ilias Lymperopoulos)
 This song had been released on Marinella & Tolis Voskopoulos - Ego Ki' Esy.
 "Den ine pou fevgis" - 3:49 - (Giorgos Hadjinasios - Manos Koufianakis)
 This song had been released on I Marinella Tou Simera.
 "Simera" - 3:02 - (Giorgos Hadjinasios - Mimis Theiopoulos)
 This song had been released on I Marinella Tou Simera.
 "S' agapo (in duet with Tolis Voskopoulos)" - 3:12 - (Philippos Papatheodorou as Giannis Axiotis - Nasos Nanopoulos)
 This song had been released on S' Agapo.
 "Proti mou fora" - 3:10 - (Nini Zaha)
 This song had been released on S' Agapo.
 "Kardoula mou de se malono" - 3:34 - (Antonis Stefanidis - Sotia Tsotou)
 This song had been released on Marinella - Gia 'Senane Mporo.
 "Kalitera" - 3:08 - (Nikos Ignatiadis)
 This song had been released on S' Agapo.
 "Pote na mi chathis ap' ti zoi mou" - 3:16 - (Nikos Ignatiadis - Manos Koufianakis)
 This song had been released on S' Agapo.
 "Ke mou milas gia monaxia" - 3:19 - (Giorgos Katsaros - Yiannis Parios)
 This song had been released on S' Agapo.
 "Gia 'senane mporo" - 2:43 - (Antonis Stefanidis - Sotia Tsotou)
 This song had been released on Marinella - Gia 'Senane Mporo.

Disc 2
 "I agapi mas" feat. Manolis Lidakis - 2:53 - (Spyros Papavasileiou - Nikos Vrettos)
 This song had been released on I Agapi Mas.
 "Xegelo ton kathena" - 3:38 - (Antonis Stefanidis - Sasa Manetta)
 This song had been released on Marinella - Gia 'Senane Mporo.
 "Ta mesanichta" - 2:34 - (Antonis Stefanidis - Sotia Tsotou)
 This song had been released on Marinella - Gia 'Senane Mporo.
 "Mipos ine erotas" - 3:26 - (Spyros Papavasileiou - Tasos Ikonomou)
 This song had been released on Marinella - Gia 'Senane Mporo.
 "Min argis (Moi j'ai mal)" - 4:19 - (Serge Lama - Antonis Stefanidis - Dimitris Iatropoulos)
 This song had been released on Marinella - Gia 'Senane Mporo.
 "Ise potami" - 3:34 - (Giorgos Hadjinasios - Michalis Bourboulis)
 This song had been released on Gia 'Sena Ton Agnosto.
 "Opos akrivos anaseno" - 3:00 - (Spyros Papavasileiou - Nikos Vrettos)
 This song had been released on I Agapi Mas.
 "Kamia fora" - 3:16 - (Giorgos Hadjinasios - Michalis Bourboulis)
 This song had been released on Gia 'Sena Ton Agnosto.
 "S' agapo" in duet with Antonis Kalogiannis - 3:29 - (Marios Tokas - Sarantis Alivizatos)
 This song had been released on Mikra Erotika.
 "Mpori" - 2:59 - (Alekos Chrysovergis - Spyros Giatrias)
 This song had been released on I Agapi Mas.
 "An s' agapousa pio ligo" - 3:47 - (Spyros Papavasileiou - Nikos Vrettos)
 This song had been released on I Agapi Mas.
 "Ise pantou ke pouthena" in duet with Kostas Hatzis - 5:18 - (Alexis Papadimitriou - Roni Sofou)
 This song had been released on I Agapi Mas.
 "Den pethenis" - 4:05 - (Philippos Papatheodorou as Giannis Axiotis - Alexis Papadimitriou - Sotia Tsotou)
 This song had been released on Mia Nihta.
 "Tipota den echi mini" - 3:24 - (Alexis Papadimitriou - Lakis Teazis)
 This song had been released on Mia Nihta.
 "Ithaki" feat. Kostas Hatzis - 3:00 - (Kostas Hatzis - Sotia Tsotou)
 This song had been released on Marinella & Kostas Hatzis - Synantisi.
 "Tora zo" - 4:11 - (Kostas Hatzis - Giannis Tzouanopoulos)
 This song had been released on Marinella & Kostas Hatzis - Synantisi.

References

2000 compilation albums
Greek-language albums
Marinella compilation albums
Marinella
Universal Music Greece compilation albums